Harlem Blues is an album by trumpeter Donald Byrd featuring performances recorded in 1987 and released on the Landmark label the following year.

Reception

On Allmusic, Scott Yanow observed "This Landmark release was trumpeter Donald Byrd's first jazz album in over 15 years after a long (and commercially if not artistically successful) detour into poppish R&B/funk. In the 1980s Byrd had neglected his trumpet playing in order to direct The Blackbyrds and teach. The period away from his instrument shows in spots on this well-intentioned set ... Ironically Byrd's own playing was not at this point up to the level of his sidemen although his chops would improve during the next couple of years". The Penguin Guide to Jazz praised Byrd's younger sidemen, while suggesting that the trumpeter's own playing had declined.

Track listing
All compositions by Donald Byrd except where noted.
 "Harlem Blues" (W. C. Handy) – 5:30
 "Fly Little Bird Fly" – 6:13
 "Voyage À Deux (Journey for Two)" (Kenny Garrett) – 7:44
 "Blue Monk" (Thelonious Monk) – 9:22
 "Alter Ego" (James Williams) – 7:36
 "Sir Master Kool Guy" – 5:03
 "Hi-Fly" (Randy Weston) – 10:56 Additional track on CD release

Personnel
Donald Byrd – trumpet, flugelhorn
Kenny Garrett – alto saxophone
Mulgrew Miller - piano
Rufus Reid – bass
Marvin "Smitty" Smith – drums
Michael Daugherty – synthesizer (tracks 1 & 5)

References

Landmark Records albums
Donald Byrd albums
1988 albums
Albums produced by Orrin Keepnews
Albums recorded at Van Gelder Studio